The Swiss Open is a darts tournament that has been held since 1984 in Basel. It was held in Lausen from 2007 to 2016 and in Zurich from 2017 to 2019.

List of tournaments

Men's

Women's

Youth's

Records and statistics

Tournament records
 Most wins 2:  Martin Adams,  Raymond van Barneveld,  Steve Brown,  Remco van Eijden.
 Most Finals 2: by 12 players.
 Most Semi Finals 4:  Raymond van Barneveld.
 Most Quarter Finals 6:  Raymond van Barneveld,  Co Stompé.
 Most Appearances 9:  Martin Atkins.
 Most Prize Money won CHF 5,697:  Scott Mitchell.
 Best winning average (107.34) :  Joey ten Berge v's  Edwin Max, 2008, Semi Final.
 Youngest Winner age 19:  James Wade.
 Oldest Winner age 46:  Dave Prins.

Nine-dart finishes

See also
List of BDO ranked tournaments
List of WDF tournaments

References

External links
Swiss Darts Association
http://www.dartsdatabase.co.uk/Swiss Open

1984 establishments in Switzerland
2019 disestablishments in Switzerland
Darts tournaments